Preble Mountain is a summit in the U.S. state of Nevada.

Preble Mountain was named after Charles S. Preble, a government surveyor.

References

Mountains of Esmeralda County, Nevada
Mountains of Nye County, Nevada